Ray Smith (born c. 1938) is a former American football and Canadian football player and college football coach.  He served as the head football coach at Hope College in Holland, Michigan from 1970 to 1994, compiling a record of 148–69–9. He played collegiately for the UCLA Bruins football team and spent three seasons playing for the Saskatchewan Roughriders of the Canadian Football League (NFL).

Head coaching record

College

References

1938 births
Living people
American football fullbacks
American football linebackers
American players of Canadian football
Hope Flying Dutchmen athletic directors
Hope Flying Dutchmen football coaches
UCLA Bruins football players
Saskatchewan Roughriders players
Junior college football coaches in the United States
Players of American football from Los Angeles
Coaches of American football from California
Players of Canadian football from Los Angeles
Sportspeople from Los Angeles
Sports coaches from Los Angeles